The Lord Mayor of Brisbane is the chief executive of the City of Brisbane, the capital of the Australian state of Queensland, and the head of the Brisbane City Council. Lord Mayor Adrian Schrinner of the Liberal National Party was sworn in on 8 April 2019, following the resignation of Graham Quirk. 

The Lord Mayor serves a four-year term running concurrently with that of the City Council, and is elected by optional preferential voting. As Brisbane is by far the largest local government area in Australia, the Lord Mayor is elected by the largest single-member electorate in the Commonwealth.

Like all mayors in Queensland, the Lord Mayor has broad executive powers and additional civic and ceremonial duties. The Lord Mayor is responsible for policy development, implementing policies enacted by the council, leading and controlling the business of council, preparing the budget and directing the chief executive and senior managers. The Lord Mayor also chairs the council's Civic Cabinet and is an ex officio member of all council committees.

See also
 List of mayors and lord mayors of Brisbane

References